Maria Szeliga (born 8 November 1952) is a Polish archer. She competed in the women's individual event at the 1980 Summer Olympics.

References

1952 births
Living people
Polish female archers
Olympic archers of Poland
Archers at the 1980 Summer Olympics
People from Rzeszów